Oleg Nikolayevich Solovyov (– Oleh Mykolayovych Solovyov; born 13 August 1973) is a retired Ukrainian professional footballer. He also holds Russian citizenship.

Club career
He made his professional debut in the Soviet Second League in 1990 for FC Sherdor Samarkand.

In 1993 he was one of the first players of the new football project of Dmytro Zlobenko that later became known as CSKA-Borysfen and Arsenal Kyiv.

References

1973 births
People from Samarkand
Living people
Uzbekistani emigrants to Russia
Soviet footballers
Association football midfielders
Ukrainian footballers
Ukraine under-21 international footballers
FC Salyut Belgorod players
FC Metalist Kharkiv players
FC Olympik Kharkiv players
FC Nyva Myronivka players
FC Arsenal Kyiv players
FC Lada-Tolyatti players
FC Tekstilshchik Kamyshin players
FC Chernomorets Novorossiysk players
FC Saturn Ramenskoye players
FC Elista players
Ukrainian Premier League players
Russian Premier League players